Sheed is a nickname for the American basketball coach and former player Rasheed Wallace.

Sheed may also refer to:

 Sheed (surname)
 Sheed, American rapper, member of the Shop Boyz
 "The Sheed", a type of basketball half-court shot named for Rasheed Wallace
 Sheed Award, a photography award
 Sheed and Ward, a British publishing house

See also
 Shed (disambiguation)